Norwegian reserve football teams compete at all levels of league football within the Norwegian football league system apart from the top two divisions, Eliteserien and 1. divisjon. The highest league these teams can currently enter is the 2. divisjon, set at the third tier of the league system. The reserve teams are attached to their first teams with a "2" suffix and must play in a lower league than the first team. Furthermore, if a club's first team plays in the 1. divisjon, the reserves team cannot play in the 2. divisjon either.

If a reserve team ends up at a promotion spot when it is not allowed to be promoted, the promotion is awarded to best following team in the league standings which is allowed to be promoted. Also, a reserve team is forcefully relegated, regardless of the final league position, if it is no longer qualified for playing at that level - i.e. if the first team is relegated to a league level where the reserve team's level is no longer allowed. For example, if an Eliteserien team is relegated while its reserve team in 2. divisjon ends up at a secure place (or even a promotion spot), the reserve team is forcefully relegated to 3. divisjon. In such a situation, the best placed qualified team at a relegation position in the league that the reserve team is relegated from will keep its place. If there are no qualified teams at relegation positions (e.g. only reserve teams no longer qualified for the level), one extra team from the division below (the best placed qualified one) is promoted.

Controversy
Reserve teams have in general been criticized for fielding uneven teams from week to week, with many first-team players one week and more youth players the next. They have also been criticized for keeping smaller clubs out of the Second Division, meaning a more centralized football culture. In 2009 manager Ivar Morten Normark proposed to throw the reserve teams out of the ordinary league pyramid, and other managers like Dag Eilev Fagermo agreed. In a survey, 19 of 31 responding Second Division clubs wanted the reserve teams out, as did 30 of the 49 responding Third Division clubs.

At the 2010 congress of the Football Association of Norway, new rules were agreed to. From 2010, reserve teams in the Second Division can only field three players over the age of 21 at any time. More "overage" players can sit on the bench, but cannot enter the field unless substituted with another overage player.

Sporting success
From time to time, a reserves team wins its group in the third tier 2. divisjon. This is the highest sporting position a reserves team can achieve, since promotion is impossible. In the 1991 2. divisjon, Brann's reserve team won group 4—ahead of Fyllingen's reserve team. Also in the 1991 2. divisjon, Rosenborg's reserve team won group 5. Rosenborg 2 won again in the 1996 2. divisjon, and the same team won group 7 in the 1998 2. divisjon. In the 1992 2. divisjon, Lillestrøm's reserve team won group 1. In the 2005 2. divisjon, Viking's reserve team won group 3.

Today
This is a list of where the reserve teams of Eliteserien and 1. divisjon clubs play, as of the 2023 season.

Reserve teams of Eliteserien clubs
Aalesund – 2. divisjon
Bodø/Glimt – 3. divisjon
Brann – 2. divisjon
HamKam – 3. divisjon
Haugesund – 4. divisjon
Lillestrøm – 3. divisjon
Molde – 3. divisjon
Odd – 3. divisjon
Rosenborg – 3. divisjon
Sandefjord – 3. divisjon
Sarpsborg 08 – 3. divisjon
Stabæk – 3. divisjon
Strømsgodset – 2. divisjon
Tromsø – 3. divisjon
Vålerenga – 2. divisjon
Viking – 3. divisjon

Reserve teams of 1. divisjon clubs
Åsane – 4. divisjon
Bryne – 4. divisjon
Fredrikstad – 3. divisjon
Hødd – 3. divisjon
Jerv – 4. divisjon
KFUM Oslo – 3. divisjon
Kongsvinger – 4. divisjon
Kristiansund – 3. divisjon
Mjøndalen – 3. divisjon
Moss – 4. divisjon
Ranheim – 4. divisjon
Raufoss – 3. divisjon
Sandnes Ulf – 3. divisjon
Skeid – 3. divisjon
Sogndal – 3. divisjon
Start – 3. divisjon

References

 
 
Norwegian Second Division
Norwegian Third Division
Norwegian Fourth Division